The men's marathon competition of the athletics events at the 2019 Pan American Games took place on the 27th July on a temporary circuit around the Parque Kennedy in Lima, Peru. The defending Pan American Games champion is Richer Pérez of Cuba.

Records

Schedule

Abbreviations
All times shown are in hours:minutes:seconds

Results

Report:

References

Athletics at the 2019 Pan American Games
2019
Panamerican
2019
2015 Panamerican Games